The double fisherman's knot or grapevine knot is a bend. This knot and the triple fisherman's knot are the variations used most often in climbing, arboriculture, and search and rescue.  The knot is formed by tying a double overhand knot, in its strangle knot form, with each end around the opposite line's standing part.

Usage
A primary use of this knot is to form high strength (round) slings of cord for connecting pieces of a climber's protection system.

Other uses
This knot, along with the basic fisherman's knot can be used to join the ends of a necklace cord. The two strangle knots are left separated, and in this way the length of the necklace can be adjusted without breaking or untying the strand.

Tying

Line form

Drop form

Security

Dyneema/Spectra's very high lubricity leads to poor knot-holding ability and has led to the recommendation to use the triple fisherman's knot rather than the traditional double fisherman's knot in 6 mm Dyneema core cord to avoid a particular failure mechanism of the double fisherman's, where first the sheath fails at the knot, then the core slips through.

See also
List of bend knots
List of knots

References

External links 
 Double Fisherman's Knot on netknots.com.

Climbing knots
Double knots